Sundara Purushan is a 2001 Indian Malayalam-language comedy-drama film directed by Jose Thomas and written by Udayakrishna-Siby K. Thomas. It is a remake of the 1994 Telugu film Subhalagnam. The film stars Suresh Gopi, Mukesh, Devayani, and Nandini.

Plot 

The story is about Suryanaranan (Suresh Gopi) who is a musician and is not-well-to-do. One day, he gets a job at a mental hospital and the owner, Jyothika (Devayani) agrees to give him a high pay. But she becomes violent when Surya refuses to sing. Then, Gevargesese (Mukesh), the doctor at the hospital reveals that she is mentally ill.

As part of the treatment Surya decides to act as he loves Jyothika. Upon hearing that he is rejected payment by the doctor, Surya runs away to his hometown to see his wife, and daughter, Manjima Mohan. After a few days, Devayani's father Ramachandra Menon (N F Vargeses) and Mukesh visit Suresh Gopi and explains that Devayani has become violent when her father refuses to allow them to marry. They need Surya to marry Devayani so that she can be treated further.

Initially, he is hesitant but Devayani's father convinces his wife Sridevi (Nandini) by rewarding her wealth as much as they wanted. They couldn't resist the offer and Surya agreed to 'act' to marry Devayani. Surya thinking the marriage ceremony is fake marries Jyothika but her father has arranged for a real marriage to take place. Overcome by wealth Nandini forgets her duties as a mother which angers Surya and he slaps her. She vows to take revenge. Later Surya gets a divorce petition sent to him. Surya agrees to go to Austria with Jyothika.

When the divorce letter arrives at Nandini's house she realises she can't live without Surya and goes to see him. Menon reveals to Nandini that she had signed the divorce petition herself when he asked her to sign some papers after her receiving a large amount of cash she had blackmailed him into giving. Nandini pleads with the doctor for help and he goes to see Menon but Menon tells him that all he wants is his daughter's good health. At the airport, Jyothika learns everything and returns to a normal mental state.

Cast
Suresh Gopi as Surya Narayanan
Mukesh as Dr. GeeVarghese
Nandini as Sreedevi, Surya's wife
Devayani as Jyothika Menon
N. F. Varghese as Ramachandra Menon, Jyothika's father
Harishree Ashokan as Philipose 
Oduvil Unnikrishnan as Aravindan, Sreedevi's Father
Baby Manjima Mohan as Daughter of Surya Narayanan and Sreedevi
Cochin Haneefa as Allawoodheen
M. S. Thripunithura as  Kannappan, Menon's Advocate
Kottayam Nazeer
Salim Kumar as Balan
Geetha Salam

Soundtrack 
The film features original soundtrack composed by Mohan Sithara for the lyrics by Kaithapram
 Bhoochakravalangalil - KJ Yesudas,Chorus
 Konchedi - Swarnalatha
 Konchedi konchum - Afsal
 Thankamanassin (D) - KJ Yesudas, Radhika Thilak
 Thankamanassin (M) - KJ Yesudas
 Thodunnathu - KJ Yesudas, Mohan Sithara,Smitha
 Thurakkaatha ponvaathil - KS Chithra

References

External links
 

2001 films
2000s Malayalam-language films
Malayalam remakes of Telugu films
Films directed by Jose Thomas
Films scored by Mohan Sithara